Lachenus impunctipennis is a species of beetle in the family Carabidae, the only species in the genus Lachenus.

References

Scaritinae